Esteghlal Mollasani F.C. is an Iranian football club based in Khuzestan province of Iran. This team was founded in 1981 in the city of Mollasani.

This team participated in the Hazfi Cup The club is currently playing in Azadegan League. Esteghlal Mollasani is one of the representatives of Khuzestan province in the first division league.

Players

First-team squad

References 

Football clubs in Iran
Association football clubs established in 1981
Sport in Khuzestan Province